Toader is a Romanian name that may refer to:

Surname 
 Adrian Toader (born 1973), Romanian football striker
 Andrei Toader (born 1997), Romanian athlete
 Leontin Toader (born 1964), Romanian football goalkeeper
 Lucia Toader (1960–2013), Romanian rower
 Marcel Toader (1963–2019), Romanian rugby union player, businessman, and media personality
 Tudorel Toader (born 1960), Romanian lawyer and professor

Given name 
 Toader-Andrei Gontaru (born 1993), Romanian rower
 Toader Arăpaşu (1915–2007), patriarch of the Romanian Orthodox Church

Romanian-language surnames